Mincho Todorov (26 December 1931 – 2 August 2022) was a Bulgarian former gymnast. He competed at the 1952 Summer Olympics and the 1956 Summer Olympics.

References

External links
 

1931 births
2022 deaths
Bulgarian male artistic gymnasts
Olympic gymnasts of Bulgaria
Gymnasts at the 1952 Summer Olympics
Gymnasts at the 1956 Summer Olympics